The Cameroonian ambassador in Washington, D. C. is the official representative of the Government in Yaoundé to the Government of the United States.

List of representatives

Cambodia–United States relations

References 

 
United States
Cameroon